A non-sovereign monarchy or constituent monarchy is one in which the head of the monarchical polity (whether a geographic territory or an ethnic group), and the polity itself, are subject to a temporal authority higher than their own. The constituent states of the German Empire or the  Princely States of British India provide historical examples; while the Zulu King, whose power derives from the Constitution of South Africa, is a contemporary one.

Structure and forms

This situation can exist in a formal capacity, such as in the United Arab Emirates (in which seven historically independent Emirates now serve as constituent states of a federation, the President of which is chosen from among the Emirs), or in a more informal one, in which theoretically independent territories are in feudal suzerainty to stronger neighbors or foreign powers (the position of the princely states in India under the British Raj), and thus can be said to lack sovereignty in the sense that they cannot, for practical purposes, conduct their affairs of state unhampered. The most formalized arrangement is known as a federal monarchy, in which the relationship between smaller constituent monarchies and the central government (which may or may not have a territory of its own) parallels that of states to a federal government in republics, such as the United States of America. Like sovereign monarchies, there exist both hereditary and elective non-sovereigns.

Systems of both formal and informal suzerainty were common before the 20th century, when monarchical systems were used by most states. During the last century, however, many monarchies have become republics, and those who remain are generally the formal sovereigns of their nations. Sub-national monarchies also exist in a few states which are, in and of themselves, not monarchical, (generally for the purpose of fostering national traditions).

The degree to which the monarchs have control over their polities varies greatly—in some they may have a great degree of domestic authority (as in the United Arab Emirates), while others have little or no policy-making power (the case with numerous ethnic monarchs today). In some, the monarch's position might be purely traditional or cultural in nature, without any formal constitutional authority at all.

Contemporary institutions

France

Wallis and Futuna is an overseas collectivity of the French Republic in Polynesia consisting of three main islands (Wallis, Futuna, and the mostly uninhabited Alofi) and a number of tiny islets. The collectivity is made up of three traditional kingdoms: Uvea, on the island of Wallis, Sigave, on the western part of the island of Futuna, and Alo, on the island of Alofi and on the eastern part of the island of Futuna. The current co-claimants to the title King of Uvea are Felice Tominiko Halagahu and Patalione Kanimoa, the current King of Alo is Filipo Katoa and the current King of Sigave is Eufenio Takala. They have been reigning since 2016.

The territory was annexed by the French Republic in 1888, and was placed under the authority of another French colony, New Caledonia. The inhabitants of the islands voted in a 1959 referendum to become an overseas collectivity of France, effective in 1961. The collectivity is governed as a parliamentary republic in which the citizens elect a Territorial Assembly, the President of which becomes the head of government. His cabinet, the Council of the Territory, is made up of the three Kings and three appointed ministers. In addition to this limited parliamentary role the Kings play, the individual kingdoms' customary legal systems have some jurisdiction in areas of civil law.

Malaysia

A number of independent Muslim sultanates and tribal territories existed in the East Indies (the modern-day states of Malaysia, Indonesia, Singapore, and Brunei) before the coming of colonial powers in the 16th century, the most prominent one in what is now Malaysia being Melaka. The first to establish colonies were the Portuguese, but they were eventually displaced by the more powerful Dutch and British. The 1824 Anglo-Dutch Treaty defined the borders between British possessions and the Dutch East Indies. The British controlled the Eastern half of modern Malaysia (in a variety of federations and colonies, see History of Malaysia) through a system of protectorates, in which native states had some domestic authority, checked by the British government. The eastern half of Malaysia was part of the independent Sultanate of Brunei until 1841, when it was granted independence as the Kingdom of Sarawak under the White Rajas. The kingdom would remain fully independent until 1888, when it accepted British protectorate status, which it retained until the last Raja, Charles Vyner Brooke ceded his rights to the United Kingdom.

The two halves were united for the first time with the formation of Malaysia in 1963. Modern Malaysia is a federal monarchy, consisting of 13 states (of which nine, known as the Malay States, are monarchical) and three federal territories. Of the Malay states, seven are sultanates (Johor, Kedah, Kelantan, Pahang, Perak, Selangor and Terengganu), one is a kingdom (Perlis), one an elective monarchy (Negeri Sembilan), while the remaining four states and the federal territories have non-monarchical systems of government. The head of state of the entire federation is a constitutional monarch styled Yang di-Pertuan Agong (In English, "He who is made lord"). The Yang di-Pertuan is elected to a five-year term by the Conference of Rulers, made up of the nine state monarchs and the governors of the remaining states. A system of informal rotation exists between the nine state monarchs.

New Zealand

The Māori of New Zealand lived in the autonomous territories of numerous tribes, called iwi, before the arrival of British colonialists in the mid 19th century. The Treaty of Waitangi, signed in 1840 by about a third of the Māori chiefs, made the Māori British subjects in return for (theoretical) autonomy and preservation of property rights. British encroachment on tribal lands continued, however, leading to the creation of the King Movement (Māori: Kīngitanga) in an attempt to foster strength through intertribal unity. Numerous tribal chiefs refused the mantle of King, but the leader of the Tainui iwi, Pōtatau Te Wherowhero, was persuaded, and was crowned as the Māori King in 1857. The federation of tribes supporting the King fought against the British during the territorial conflicts known as the New Zealand Wars (which resulted in the confiscation of four million acres (16,000 km²) of tribal land), not emerging from their refuge in the rural region known as King Country until 1881.

The position of the Māori monarch has never had formal authority or constitutional status in New Zealand (which is itself a constitutional monarchy, as a Commonwealth realm). Before its defeat in the Land Wars, however, the King Movement wielded temporal authority over large parts of the North Island and possessed some of the features of a state, including magistrates, a state newspaper known as Te Hokioi, and government ministers (there was even a minister of Pākehā affairs [ being the Māori term for Europeans]). A parliament, the Kauhanganui, was set up at Maungakawa, near Cambridge, in 1889 or 1890. Today, though the monarch lacks political power, the position is invested with a great deal of mana (cultural prestige). The monarchy is elective in theory, in that there is no official dynasty or order of succession, but hereditary in practice, as every monarch chosen by the tribal chiefs has been a direct descendant of Potatau Te Wherowhero (though not always the firstborn child of the previous ruler). Their Māori monarch does not have a physical crown: the "coronation" is performed by tapping the ascendant on the forehead with a Bible (the same Bible has been used for every monarch since Te Wherowhero).

The seventh and current Māori King is Te Arikinui Tuheitia Paki. He was crowned on 21 August 2006, following the death on 15 August of his mother, Queen Te Atairangikaahu, whose forty-year reign was the longest of any Māori monarch.

Nigeria

The non-sovereign monarchs of Nigeria, known locally as the traditional rulers, serve the twin contemporary functions of fostering traditional preservation in the wake of globalisation and representing their people in their dealings with the official government, which in turn serves to recognise their titles. They have very little in the way of technical authority, but are in possession of real influence in practice due to their control of popular opinion within the various tribes. In addition to this a number of them, such as the Sultan of Sokoto and the Ooni of Ife, retain their spiritual authority as religious leaders of significant parts of the country in question's population.

South Africa

The Zulu Kingdom was the independent nation state of the Zulu people, founded by Shaka kaSenzangakhona in 1816. The Kingdom was a major regional power for most of the 19th century, but eventually was drawn into conflict with the expanding British Empire, and after a reduction in territory after defeat in the Anglo-Zulu War, lost its independence in 1887, when it was incorporated into the Natal Colony, and later the Union of South Africa.

The Zulu Kings remained pretenders to their officially abolished thrones during the 20th century, but were granted official authority by the Traditional Leadership Clause of the republican Constitution of South Africa. The constitution recognizes the right of "traditional authorities" to operate by and amend systems of customary law, and directs the courts to apply these laws as applicable. It also empowers the national and provincial legislatures to formally establish houses for and councils of traditional leaders. The Zulu King is head of this council of tribal chiefs, known as the Ubukhosi.

The current Zulu King is Misuzulu Zulu, who reigns as King of the Zulu nation, rather than of Zululand, which is today part of the South African province of KwaZulu-Natal. Zulu ascended the throne in 2021.

United Arab Emirates

The numerous small sheikdoms on the Persian Gulf were under informal suzerainty to the Ottoman Empire during the 16th century. Later, this dominance gradually shifted to the United Kingdom. In 1853 the rulers signed a Perpetual Maritime Truce, and from that point onward delegated disputes between themselves to the British for arbitration (it is from this arrangement that the territory's former title, the "Trucial" States was derived). In 1892 this arrangement was formalized into a protectorate in which the British assumed responsibility for the emirate's protection. This arrangement existed until 1971, when the UAE was granted independence.

The U.A.E.'s system of governance is unique, in that while the seven constituent emirates are all absolute monarchies, the structure of the federal government itself is not (theoretically, at least) monarchical, as it is in Malaysia. Instead, the formal governmental structure has features of both semi-presidential and parliamentary systems, with some modifications. In purely parliamentary systems the legislature elects the head of government (the Prime Minister) and can force their resignation, and that of the cabinet, through a no-confidence vote, while the head of state is generally appointed or hereditary position without practical power (such as a constitutional monarch or Governor General); in semi-presidential systems the head of state (a President) is popularly elected and takes a role in governing alongside the head of government, though his cabinet is still accountable to the legislature and can be forced to resign.

The U.A.E does possess a weak legislature, called the National Federal Council, which is partially elected and partially appointed, but neither the legislature nor the population at large has a hand in determining the country's political leadership. In the U.A.E., it is the Federal Supreme Council (a sort of "upper" cabinet made up of the seven Emirs), which elects both the head of state (the President) and the head of government (the Prime Minister), both of whom have considerable governing power, to five year terms. This is a purely formal election, however (similar to the later royal elections of Polish kings), as the rulers of the two largest and wealthiest Emirates, Abu Dhabi and Dubai, have always held the posts of President and Prime Minister, respectively. This Council also elects the lower cabinet, the Council of Ministers, as well as the judges of Supreme Court.

The seven constituent Emirates of the U.A.E. are Abu Dhabi, Ajman, Dubai, Fujairah, Ras al-Khaimah, Sharjah, and Umm al-Quwain.

Uganda

In 1888, during the Scramble for Africa, the powerful Bantu Kingdom of Buganda was placed under the administration of the Imperial British East Africa Company. In 1894, however, the company relinquished its rights to the territory to the British government, which expanded its control to the neighboring Kingdoms of Toro, Ankole, Busoga, Bunyoro  and tribal territories in establishing the Uganda Protectorate, which was maintained until independence was granted in 1961.

Upon achieving independence, Uganda became a republic, and its first years were characterized by a power struggle between the Uganda People's Congress and the Bugandan nationalist and monarchist Kabaka Yekka Party. Edward Muteesa II, the King of Buganda, was appointed President and commander of the armed forces, but in 1967 Prime Minister Apollo Milton Obote staged a coup against the Bugandan King in the Battle of Mengo Hill. During Obote's subsequent rule the monarchies were abolished, and remained so during the rule of Idi Amin as well.

Restoration of the traditional monarchies came in 1993. The restored monarchies are cultural in nature, and their Kings do not have policy-making power. The Kingdom of Rwenzururu, which did not exist before the 1966 abolition, was officially established in 2008. The areas which now make up the Kingdom were formerly part of the Kingdom of Toro. The region is populated by Konjo and Amba peoples, whose territory was incorporated into the Kingdom of Toro by the British. A secession movement existed during Uganda's early years of independence, and after a 2005 report from the Ugandan government found that the great majority of  the regions inhabitants favored the creation of a Rwenzururu monarchy, the Kingdom was recognized by the Ugandan cabinet on March 17, 2008.

References